Jean-Pierre Plancade (born 2 August 1949 in Toulouse, Haute-Garonne) is a member of the Senate of France, representing the Haute-Garonne department.  He is a member of the Radical Party of the Left.

References
Page on the Senate website

1949 births
Living people
Politicians from Toulouse
Politicians from Occitania (administrative region)
Radical Party of the Left politicians
French Senators of the Fifth Republic
Senators of Haute-Garonne